Oliver Andrew Chessum (born 6 September 2000) is an English rugby union player for Leicester Tigers in Premiership Rugby, his preferred position is lock, but he also plays back row. Chessum won the Premiership Rugby title in 2022 starting in the final against Saracens.

Early life

Chessum began playing rugby at Carre's Grammar School in Sleaford at the age of 13, before playing club rugby for Sleaford, Newark and Kesteven.

Career
Chessum was attached to Leicester's academy as a teenager but was not taken into the main senior academy at 16, instead he played for his club and the Notts, Lincs and Derby Rugby Union youth teams, during which time he represented England Counties at U18 level. He joined Nottingham straight from school and impressed at the club making 11 appearances.  He then went on to join Leicester Tigers in the summer of 2020.  He made his Leicester debut at Kingsholm against Gloucester on 30 August 2020.

On 20 November 2021 he was named as the Leicester Mercury's man of the match for his performance in a 55-7 Premiership Rugby Cup win against Wasps.

Chessum started the 2021-22 Premiership Rugby final, and claimed a crucial loose ball to set up possession before Freddie Burns' 80th minute drop goal which sealed a 15-12 win for Leicester.

Chessum played in 14 from 17 games at the start of the 2021-22 season and his form saw him called up for the  squad for the 2022 Six Nations Championship on 18 January 2022, England coach Eddie Jones compared Chessum to Courtney Lawes, highlighting his lineout skills and his ball-carrying abilities.  On 13 February 2022 Chessum made his England debut as a replacement in a 33-0 win over Italy in Rome.

International tries

References

External links
 

2000 births
Living people
English rugby union players
Leicester Tigers players
Nottingham R.F.C. players
Rugby union locks
Rugby union players from Boston, Lincolnshire
England international rugby union players